The polis of Sparta was the greatest military land power of classical Greek antiquity. During the Classical period, Sparta governed, dominated or influenced the entire Peloponnese. Additionally, the defeat of the Athenians and the Delian League in the Peloponnesian War in 431–404 BC resulted in a short-lived Spartan dominance of the southern Greek world from 404 to 371 BC. Due to their mistrust of others, Spartans discouraged the creation of records about their internal affairs. The only histories of Sparta are from the writings of Xenophon, Thucydides, Herodotus and Plutarch, none of whom were Spartans. Plutarch was writing several centuries after the period of Spartan hegemony had ceased. This creates difficulties in understanding the Spartan political system, which was distinctly different from any other Greek polis.

History and rise to power

The Spartans had early conquered the southern Peloponnese and incorporated the territory into the enlarged Sparta state.  Spartan society functioned within three classes: homoioi or spartiates, perioeci, and the helots.  The helots were captives of war and were state-owned slaves of Sparta.   They powered the city-state's agrarian economy and were the work force.  Additionally, the other class of working population in Spartan society were the perioeci meaning “dwellers around” who were free peoples of conquered territories.  The perioeci were allowed to maintain their own infrastructures, administrative arrangements and local economy, but had to pay tribute to Sparta and provide soldiers for the military. The homoioi were the citizens of Sparta.    They were the elite class and were the only deserving of the title Spartan.  As a result, the Spartan population was very small in comparison with the working classes.  There was a ratio of 7 or 8 helots to every Spartan citizen.   These three populations performed complementary functions that distinguished Sparta with a unique economic and social organization. While the helots and the perioeci were the workforce in agriculture and industry, the Spartans could devote themselves to training, maintaining, and operating the military.  The reason for the continual strong military existence was to preserve order in Sparta and hold the large enslaved populations in check.

Sparta's post Peloponnesian War regime
Lysander was the Spartan who after the end of the Peloponnesian War in 404 BC established many of the foreign pro-Spartan governments throughout the Aegean. He also established many Spartan garrisons. Most of the polis ruling systems he set up were ten man oligarchies called decarchies. Harmosts, Spartan military governors, were left as the head of the decarchies.  As the men appointed were loyal to Lysander rather than Sparta, this system has been described as Lysander's private empire.  In this establishment of a new Aegean order, many lost their lives or were exiled but on the other hand Agina and Melos were restored to their former inhabitants.

Sparta was divided over what to do about Athens itself.  Lysander and King Agis were for total destruction as were Sparta's leading allies Corinth and Thebes.  However, a more moderate faction led by Pausanias gained the upper hand.  Athens was spared but her long walls and the fortifications of Piraeus were demolished.  Lysander did manage to insert the significant condition that Athens recall her exiles.

The return of the exiles to Athens contributed to the political instability of Athens allowing Lysander to establish shortly the oligarchy that has come to be known as Thirty Tyrants, composed of men beholden to him.  The danger of so much power being in the hands of one person had become sufficiently clear that both King Agis and King Pausanias agreed that Lysander's wings needed to be clipped.  The decarchies were declared abolished and Athens quickly benefited when Sparta permitted democracy to be restored at Athens.

Agesilaus and his campaigns

Agesilaus II was one of the two kings of Sparta during Sparta's hegemony. Plutarch later wrote that Agesilaus was a king of the traditional Spartan ideals, often seen wearing his traditional cloak which was threadbare.   He began his kingship after the end of the Peloponnesian war after his brother Agis II died and was left without an heir. (Agis’ son Leotychidas was rumored to be the illegitimate son of the Athenian Alcibiades.)  One of Agesilaus’ biggest supporters was the famous Spartan naval commander Lysander, who was previously Agesilaus’ erastēs, or mentor.

The Campaigns
Agesilaus’ first campaign was one which trekked into the eastern Aegean and Persian territories via the Hellespont. He first descended upon the Phrygians and their leader Tissaphernes who had broken a “solemn league” with the Greeks and had earned the “downright contempt of the gods.” He followed Tissaphernes into Persian territory. The Persian king, fearing further plundering of his country ordered Tissaphernes beheaded. He then attempted to bribe Agesilaus with money to leave Asia Minor.

Remaining true to the Spartan ideals of austere living practices, Agesilaus rejected the gold saying “he would rather see it in his soldier’s hands than his own.”  Agesilaus did, however, remove his army into Phrygia, grateful for the death of Tissaphernes.

Agesilaus soon began another campaign into the western regions of the Persian Empire. Plutarch states that he wished to march his armies all the way to the Persian capital of Susa. He was unfortunately deterred by unpleasant news from Epicydidas that the mainland Greek poleis were starting war once again.   This would later become known as the Corinthian War (395–387 BC) and featured an alliance between the Argives, Corinthians, Athenians and Thebans against Sparta. The Corinthian war took place between 395 and 386 BC.

In Greece, the Spartans under Agesilaus met the numerous rebelling poleis.  Among the most important battles that the Spartans fought in this war was that of Coronea, which was fought against a coalition of Greeks but especially the Thebans. The Spartans sought the aid of the Persians, asking them to cut off their support of the Thebans, Corinthians and Athenians. The resulting Peace of Antalcidas, named for the Spartan who negotiated it, was established in 386 BC and resulted in Sparta's loss of its Asian territories.

The Boeotian War

During the winter of 379/378 BC, a group of Theban exiles were able to sneak into the city and, despite the 1500-strong Spartan garrison, succeed in liberating Thebes. During the next few years, Sparta mounted four expeditions against Thebes, which completely failed to bring Thebes to heel. In 375 BC, Sparta suffered a symbolically significant defeat at the hands of Thebes in the Battle of Tegyra.  Finally, the Greek city-states attempted a peace on the mainland by sending diplomats to meet with Agesilaus in Sparta. Epaminondas, the Theban diplomat, angered Agesilaus by arguing for the freedom of the non-Spartans of Laconia. Agesilaus then struck the Thebans out of the treaty. The ensuing Battle of Leuctra in 371 BC marked the end of Spartan hegemony. Agesilaus himself did not fight at Leuctra so as not to appear too belligerent.

Sparta after hegemony
During the Spartan hegemony in Athens there is evidence of criticism of democracy. A document in the 420s BC by a political writer known as the "Old Oligarch" demonstrates the anti-democratic sentiments in Athens. The “Old Oligarch’s” political outlook is shaped by his belief that the economic classes were the source to political motivation; this view is a direct rejection of democracy's efforts to establish civil unity. The “Old Oligarch” argues that the polis by nature is a battlefield rather than a site of public dialogue because individuals side with their socio-economic rank. Yet, despite this anti-democratic feeling, democracy eventually returned to Athens after the expulsion of the Thirty Tyrants.

The importance of Sparta in politics largely drops off after Sparta's defeat at Leuctra. Following Agesilaus’ death in 360 BC, Archidamus III became king and practiced a policy of non-conflict between Athens and the Second Naval Confederacy (357-355 BC).  Between 355 and 346 BC, they allied with Athens against Thebes and the Amphictyonic Council effectively pulling Theban attention away from the Peloponnese.

References

External links